Cowtail may refer to:
Cowtail stingray
Cowtail Bar, a former ice cream parlor at Holly Ravine Farm in Cherry Hill, New Jersey

See also
Cowtail Pine (disambiguation)